is a Japanese mixed martial artist. He is the current Pancrase Flyweight Champion and a former Pancrase Super Flyweight Champion.

Mixed martial arts career
Sunabe began his professional MMA career in 2001 in his native Japan. He has fought primarily for the Pancrase promotion where he has been both the Pancrase Flyweight Champion and Pancrase Super Flyweight Champion.

Sunabe has been working to promote MMA in Okinawa, his hometown, and is going to host the grappling event series "OKINAWA WWF" there.

In December 2017, Sunabe participated in a Flyweight Kickboxing Tournament held by Rizin Fighting Federation. He faced Yamato Fujita in the semi-finals and lost via knockout in the first round.

Professional wrestling career

Sunabe is also an occasional professional wrestler, often appearing for joshi promotion Oz Academy in intergender and tag matches. He debuted in professional wrestling in 2007 to a losing effort to Daisuke Sekimoto. He has also appeared for promotions such as Hard Hit, Ganbare Pro, DDT Pro Wrestling and Ryukyu Dragon Pro Wrestling.

Championships and accomplishments

Mixed martial arts
Pancrase
Flyweight King of Pancrase
Super Flyweight King of Pancrase (Former Flyweight King of Pancrase) 
Pancrase Flyweight tournament 2011 Winner

Mixed martial arts record

|-
|Loss
|align=center| 29–11–4
|Nobuyoshi Nakatsuka	
|TKO (knee and punches)
|Rizin 36
|
|align=center|1
|align=center|1:40
|Okinawa, Japan
|
|-
|Loss
|align=center| 29–10–4
|Yoshiro Maeda
|Decision (unanimous)
|Rizin 32
|
|align=center|3
|align=center|5:00
|Okinawa, Japan
|
|-
|Loss
|align=center| 29–9–4
|Daichi Kitakata
|TKO (punches)
|Pancrase 307
|
|align=center|5
|align=center|0:38
|Tokyo, Japan
|
|-
|Loss
|align=center| 29–8–4
|Haruo Ochi
|KO (soccer kicks)
|Rizin 13
|
|align=center|3
|align=center|2:53
|Saitama, Japan
|
|-
| Win
| align=center| 29–7–4
| Shinya Murofushi
| KO (slam)
| Pancrase: 295
| 
| align=center| 2
| align=center| 4:11
| Tokyo, Japan
| Defended Pancrase Strawweight Championship
|-
| Win
| align=center| 28–7–4
| Daichi Kitakata
| Submission (rear naked choke)
| Pancrase: 283
| 
| align=center| 2
| align=center| 0:48
| Tokyo, Japan
| Defended Pancrase Strawweight Championship
|-
| Win
| align=center| 27–7–4
| Ryo Hatta
| TKO (elbows)
| Pancrase: 278
| 
| align=center| 3
| align=center| 3:47
| Tokyo, Japan
|
|-
| Win
| align=center| 26–7–4
| Hiroyuki Abe
| Decision (split)
| Pancrase: 271
| 
| align=center| 5
| align=center| 5:00
| Tokyo, Japan
|
|-
| Win
| align=center| 25–7–4
| Takafumi Ito
| Submission (rear naked choke)
| Pancrase: 268
| 
| align=center| 3
| align=center| 0:27
| Tokyo, Japan
| 
|-
| Win
| align=center| 24–7–4
| Seiji Ozuka
| KO (head kick)
| Pancrase: 265
| 
| align=center| 2
| align=center| 1:39
| Tokyo, Japan
|
|-
| Win
| align=center| 23–7–4
| Tatsuya So
| Decision (split)
| Tenkaichi Fight: Tenkaichi 74
| 
| align=center| 3
| align=center| 5:00
| Koza, Japan
|
|-
| Win
| align=center| 22–7–4
| Hiroaki Ijima
| Decision (unanimous)
| Pancrase: 259
| 
| align=center| 3
| align=center| 5:00
| Tokyo, Japan
|
|-
| Win
| align=center| 21–7–4
| Ho Yong Jang
| Submission (armbar)
| Tenkaichi Fight: Tenkaichi 70
| 
| align=center| 1
| align=center| 4:33
| Koza, Japan
|
|-
| Win
| align=center| 20–7–4
| Noboru Tahara
| Decision (unanimous)
| Pancrase 252: 30th Anniversary
| 
| align=center| 3
| align=center| 5:00
| Yokohama, Japan
| 
|-
| Win
| align=center| 19–7–4
| Chikara Shimabukuro
| Decision (unanimous)
| Pancrase 250: 2013 Neo-Blood Tournament Finals
| 
| align=center| 2
| align=center| 5:00
| Tokyo, Japan
| 
|-
| Win
| align=center| 18–7–4
| Shingo Yakul
| KO (flying knee)
| Pancrase: Sakaguchi Dojo vs. Pancrase
| 
| align=center| 1
| align=center| 4:23
| Okinawa, Japan
| 
|-
| Win
| align=center| 17–7–4
| Masakazu Utsugi
| Decision (unanimous)
| Pancrase: Progress Tour 12
| 
| align=center| 3
| align=center| 5:00
| Tokyo, Japan
| 
|-
| Win
| align=center| 16–7–4
| Toshio Mitani
| Submission (armbar)
| Pancrase: Progress Tour 6
| 
| align=center| 1
| align=center| 2:48
| Okinawa, Japan
| 
|-
| Win
| align=center| 15–7–4
| Hiroyuki Abe
| TKO (punches)
| Pancrase: Impressive Tour 13
| 
| align=center| 3
| align=center| 4:10
| Tokyo, Japan
| 
|-
| Win
| align=center| 14–7–4
| Yoshihiro Matsunaga
| Decision (unanimous)
| Pancrase: Impressive Tour 8
| 
| align=center| 2
| align=center| 5:00
| Tokyo, Japan
| 
|-
| Loss
| align=center| 13–7–4
| Kiyotaka Shimizu
| Decision (majority)
| Pancrase: Impressive Tour 5
| 
| align=center| 3
| align=center| 5:00
| Tokyo, Japan
| 
|-
| Draw
| align=center| 13–6–4
| Kiyotaka Shimizu
| Draw
| Pancrase: Passion Tour 11
| 
| align=center| 3
| align=center| 5:00
| Tokyo, Japan
| 
|-
| Win
| align=center| 13–6–3
| Shinpei Tahara
| KO (slam)
| Pancrase: Passion Tour 8
| 
| align=center| 3
| align=center| 2:32
| Tokyo, Japan
| 
|-
| Win
| align=center| 12–6–3
| Hayato Sato
| TKO (punches)
| Pancrase: Passion Tour 4
| 
| align=center| 1
| align=center| 2:31
| Tokyo, Japan
| 
|-
| Loss
| align=center| 11–6–3
| Kiyotaka Shimizu
| Decision (majority)
| Pancrase: Passion Tour 1
| 
| align=center| 3
| align=center| 5:00
| Tokyo, Japan
| 
|-
| Win
| align=center| 11–5–3
| Isao Hirose
| Decision (unanimous)
| Pancrase: Changing Tour 6
| 
| align=center| 3
| align=center| 5:00
| Tokyo, Japan
| 
|-
| Win
| align=center| 10–5–3
| Takuya Eizumi
| KO (punch)
| Pancrase: Changing Tour 3
| 
| align=center| 1
| align=center| 4:35
| Tokyo, Japan
| 
|-
| Win
| align=center| 9–5–3
| Kiyotaka Shimizu
| Decision (unanimous)
| Pancrase: Real 2008
| 
| align=center| 2
| align=center| 5:00
| Okinawa, Japan
| 
|-
| Loss
| align=center| 8–5–3
| Daichi Fujiwara
| KO (head kick)
| Pancrase: Rising 7
| 
| align=center| 2
| align=center| 0:09
| Osaka, Japan
| 
|-
| Draw
| align=center| 8–4–3
| Koji Yoshimoto
| Draw (majority)
| Pancrase: Rising 6
| 
| align=center| 3
| align=center| 5:00
| Tokyo, Japan
| 
|-
| Win
| align=center| 8–4–2
| Takumi Murata
| Decision (majority)
| Pancrase: Real 2007
| 
| align=center| 2
| align=center| 5:00
| Okinawa, Japan
| 
|-
| Draw
| align=center| 7–4–2
| Naoji Fujimoto
| Draw
| Pancrase: Rising 1
| 
| align=center| 2
| align=center| 5:00
| Osaka, Japan
| 
|-
| Win
| align=center| 7–4–1
| Roberto Matsumoto
| TKO (knee injury)
| Cage Force 1
| 
| align=center| 1
| align=center| 5:00
| Tokyo, Japan
| 
|-
| Loss
| align=center| 6–4–1
| Manabu Inoue
| Decision (unanimous)
| Pancrase: Blow 7
| 
| align=center| 2
| align=center| 5:00
| Tokyo, Japan
| 
|-
| Win
| align=center| 6–3–1
| Russ Miura
| Decision (unanimous)
| Pancrase: Blow 1
| 
| align=center| 3
| align=center| 5:00
| Tokyo, Japan
| 
|-
| Win
| align=center| 5–3–1
| Minoru Tsuiki
| Submission (triangle choke)
| Pancrase: Z
| 
| align=center| 1
| align=center| 4:21
| Kumamoto, Japan
| 
|-
| Draw
| align=center| 4–3–1
| Masashi Kameda
| Draw
| Pancrase: Brave 7
| 
| align=center| 2
| align=center| 5:00
| Osaka, Japan
| 
|-
| Loss
| align=center| 4–3
| Masashi Kameda
| DQ (accidental headbutt)
| Pancrase: Brave 6
| 
| align=center| 1
| align=center| 3:52
| Tokyo, Japan
| 
|-
| Loss
| align=center| 4–2
| Miki Shida
| Decision (unanimous)
| Pancrase: Brave 1
| 
| align=center| 2
| align=center| 5:00
| Tokyo, Japan
| 
|-
| Loss
| align=center| 4–1
| Yoshiro Maeda
| Decision (unanimous)
| Pancrase: Hybrid 5
| 
| align=center| 2
| align=center| 5:00
| Kanagawa, Japan
| 
|-
| Win
| align=center| 4–0
| Kunihiro Watanabe
| Technical Submission (guillotine choke)
| Pancrase: Spirit 8
| 
| align=center| 2
| align=center| 1:17
| Kanagawa, Japan
| 
|-
| Win
| align=center| 3–0
| Masahito Wachi
| Decision (split)
| Pancrase: 2002 Neo-Blood Tournament Second Round
| 
| align=center| 3
| align=center| 5:00
| Tokyo, Japan
| 
|-
| Win
| align=center| 2–0
| Rambaa Somdet
| Decision (majority)
| Deep: 4th Impact
| 
| align=center| 3
| align=center| 5:00
| Tokyo, Japan
| 
|-
| Win
| align=center| 1–0
| Naoki Deguchi
| Decision (split)
| Pancrase: Proof 4
| 
| align=center| 2
| align=center| 5:00
| Tokyo, Japan
|

See also
 List of current mixed martial arts champions
 List of male mixed martial artists

References

External links

1979 births
Living people
Japanese male mixed martial artists
Japanese male professional wrestlers
Flyweight mixed martial artists
Mixed martial artists utilizing wrestling
Mixed martial artists utilizing kickboxing
Japanese male sport wrestlers